The 1992 Oceanian Futsal Championship (OFC) was the first edition of the main international futsal tournament of the Oceanian region. It took place from Jun 15 to Jun 20, 1992, and was hosted by Brisbane, Australia.

The tournament also acted as a qualifying tournament for the 1992 FIFA Futsal World Championship in Hong Kong. Australia won the tournament, and qualified for the World Cup.

Group stage

Group

All time at UTC+10

Champion

References

External links
 Oceanian Futsal Championship su RSSSF.com

1992
1992 in futsal
Futsal
1992 in Australian soccer
1992
Sport in Brisbane